Daxing is a town under the administration of Dongfeng County, Jilin, China. , it has 12 villages under its administration.

References 

Township-level divisions of Jilin
Dongfeng County